Bethel is an unincorporated community in Polk County, Oregon, United States at the base of the Eola Hills in Plum Valley. Bethel is considered a ghost town as the only remaining structure is a school, now serving as a church. The locale was named by the Rev. Glen O. Burnett for a Church of Christ in Missouri where he had served as pastor. Bethel is a common name for churches as it is a Hebrew word that means "house of god". After traveling with his family on the Oregon Trail, Burnett settled on a Donation Land Claim in 1846. Burnett later rode circuit to the surrounding area, preaching in nearby communities, including Rickreall.

History
Another settler, Dr. Nathaniel Hudson, came to the area in 1851 and founded a school, Bethel Academy, in 1852. Dr. Hudson moved to a new land claim in the Dallas area in 1854 and the academy closed.  With the departure of Dr. Hudson and the closing of his Academy, the continuing need for a school prompted the organizing of a replacement in 1855.  A year later in response to their need for higher education, Bethel College was chartered by the Territorial Legislature Oregon Territorial Legislature as one of the earliest colleges in the state. Bethel College. Pioneer Jesse Applegate, who was a friend of Burnett's from Missouri and who traveled in the same wagon train, was on the college's board of trustees. In 1861 Bethel College faced financial problems, the result of the widespread economic disruption caused by the Civil War.  A Disciples of Christ group was planning a new college and had already obtained their land at Monmouth.  After much negotiation, the two groups decided that Monmouth was a more advantageous location for a college, they had acquired more land there to work with, and had attracted more financial support.  So the Monmouth group bought much of the physical assets of Bethel College and moved them to Monmouth.  Bethel College ceased operations as an institution of higher education but kept the elementary and high schools, named them Bethel Institute, which was owned and operated by Bethel College.  Bethel College still exists as a chartered college and is still the owner of the land and buildings of the school (now a church) at Bethel.  Bethel College has never merged with Monmouth College or any other entity.  It is still an independent, chartered institution of higher education.  Over the years, Monmouth College has survived through several successive identities including Oregon Normal School and Oregon College of Education, to its present status as Western Oregon University. Western Oregon University. The original college building in Bethel was eventually dismantled.  and was replaced by the present building now occupied by Bethel Church.

The first store in Bethel was built in 1855, and the post office followed in 1865. At one time the town had a blacksmith shop, carpentry shop, and a wagon shop.  Bethel post office ran from 1865 to 1880. The town was located on the wagon road that went between Amity and Monmouth, but when a new narrow-gauge railway line was built in the area, through Amity, Dallas and Independence, it bypassed Bethel and instead was routed through McCoy, a decision which contributed to Bethel's decline.

In October 2013, the school's former auditorium, renovated two months earlier to become the Eola Hills Charter School within the Amity School District, burned down. The church building was not damaged.

Agriculture and viticulture
Today, the area is part of the Eola-Amity Hills AVA with many wineries and vineyards, including Bethel Heights Vineyard which was named after the area.

Gallery
The Plum Valley area around Bethel.

References

External links
 Historic images of Bethel from Salem Public Library
 Bethel Cemetery

Churches of Christ
Ghost towns in Oregon
Populated places established in 1846
Unincorporated communities in Polk County, Oregon
1865 establishments in Oregon
Populated places established in 1865
Unincorporated communities in Oregon